Number 1 is the first Japanese album by South Korean boy band Big Bang, released by YG Entertainment and Universal Music Japan in Japan. Some of the songs were written and composed by the members themselves, most notably G-Dragon. The album includes the group's first two mini-albums in Japan and songs from their third mini-album in South Korea. Noticeably, this album is primarily in English and includes versions of songs previously released in Korean.

Track listing

References

External links
Big Bang Official site
Big Bang Japan Official Site
Big Bang by Universal Music Japan

BigBang (South Korean band) albums
2008 albums
Universal Music Japan albums
Japanese-language albums
Albums produced by G-Dragon